Nick Jr. is a Scandinavian television channel targeting preschoolers.

Viasat announced the launch of Nick Jr. on 25 May 2010. It is scheduled to launch on September 1, 2010. Viasat and Tele2 TV were broadcasting the channel from the start. Canal Digital added the channel on January 7, 2013.

Nick Jr. became MTV Networks' fourth dedicated Swedish channel, after MTV, Nickelodeon and Comedy Central.

References 

Scandinavia
Pan-Nordic television channels
Children's television networks
Television channels in Sweden
Television channels and stations established in 2010
2010 establishments in Europe
Television channel articles with incorrect naming style
Television stations in Denmark
Television channels in Norway
Television channels in Finland
Television channels in Estonia
Television channels in Latvia